Peter Robinson (born 3 November 1962), better known as Marilyn, is an English singer. He is known for his 1983 hit "Calling Your Name" and his androgynous appearance.

Early life 
Robinson was born in Kingston, Jamaica. At age five, he moved with his mother to Borehamwood, England. He left school at 15, and has stated that he was bullied at school for being feminine, and that he self-harmed.

The Marilyn persona 
As a boy, Robinson loved Marilyn Monroe's image, and Marilyn became his school nickname. While the name originated from homophobic bullies at school, Robinson decided to appropriate it to his advantage. As a teenager, he was a regular nightclub-goer and wanted to look different, so he adopted a Marilyn Monroe image wearing vintage dresses with bleached blond hair. He became part of the British New Romantic movement which emerged in the late 1970s club scene and was popularised in the early 1980s.

Robinson was a regular at 'The Blitz' nightclub (regulars being labelled as Blitz Kids), a highly stylised club in London run by Steve Strange of the pop group Visage, and a place which spawned many early 1980s pop stars such as Spandau Ballet. During this time, Robinson met Boy George (prior to his forming Culture Club), and the pair would later share a squat together.

In 1979, Robinson appeared in the documentary Steppin' Out directed by Lyndall Hobbs, which explored the fashionable nightclubs and the trendy pop culture scenes that were famous in London in the late '70s. It was shown as the support film to Alien in British cinemas. Also in 1979, he appeared in the first segment of director Derek Jarman's 12-minute short film Broken English. While Boy George went on to form Culture Club in 1981 and secured a recording deal with Virgin Records, Marilyn was still scouting for a recording contract and had relocated to Los Angeles for some time. There, he worked as a personal assistant to daytime soap star Terry Lester, and teamed up with songwriter and pop entrepreneur Paul Caplin who became his manager.

Career

Music career: 1980s 
After Marilyn's friend Boy George had made a commercial impact with Culture Club, record companies were looking for other artists with a similar cross-dressing image. In 1983, following a high-profile appearance in the promo video for Eurythmics' hit single, "Who's That Girl?", Robinson signed his own recording contract as Marilyn with Phonogram Records.

Marilyn's first chart success came in late 1983 with his debut single "Calling Your Name" which reached the Top 5 in the UK and Australia, and number 1 in Japan. He had two further minor UK Top 40 hits in 1984 with "Cry and Be Free" and "You Don't Love Me" (the latter of which he performed at the Children's Royal Variety Performance held at Her Majesty's Theatre, London, in the presence of The Princess Anne).

In March 1984, Marilyn flew to Australia for a 10-day promotional tour and was besieged by fans who were waiting to greet him at Melbourne Airport. Film footage of his arrival was broadcast on that evening's television news. While in Australia, he was attacked and kicked in the face by a member of the public at the Exchange Hotel, a gay bar venue in Sydney, sustaining a bruised eye from the incident.

In late 1984, Marilyn took part in the Band Aid charity single "Do They Know It's Christmas" along with various other pop stars of the era. In early 1985, now facing financial difficulties and being forced to give up his London home, Phonogram Records dispatched him to Detroit, Michigan, to work with producer Don Was. While in America, he cut his trademark long blonde hair short and ceased wearing make-up, abandoning the image that had brought him his initial success. After spending a week recording new material with Was, Marilyn was scheduled to perform live for the first time at New York's famed Area nightclub. The performance was intended to be filmed for use in the promo video for his new single, "Baby U Left Me", but the film crew were delayed, and although Marilyn proceeded to go onstage anyway, the performance was ruined by technical problems with the club's PA system. Midway through his first song, Marilyn abandoned the performance.

In June 1985, Marilyn released his debut album, Despite Straight Lines. Despite including his three earlier UK Top 40 hit singles, the album only charted in Australia. Further singles from the album, "Baby U Left Me" and "Pray for That Sunshine" were unsuccessful, although the former reached the top 40 in Australia.

By this time, Robinson's drug addiction and his highly publicised disputes with Boy George damaged his public image. Public tastes were also changing, and his music career suffered.

Despite the problems in New York the year before, Marilyn performed live once in December 1986 at the Mud Club in London, where he performed a cover version of "Spirit in the Sky" which was planned to be his new single but was never released.

By 1989, Robinson had signed with the Interbeat label, though again no new recordings surfaced. He then dropped out of the public eye for the next decade, abandoning his music career.

Activities from late 1990s–2006 
Robinson first reappeared in 1999 when he was interviewed on the Channel 4 programme Top Ten New Romantics, though he himself was not listed in the chart. In 2000, he attempted to relaunch his career and recorded a new single as Marilyn, a cover version of the Dennis Brown song "How Could I Live?" for Desilu Records based in Jamaica. Robinson recorded the track in Jamaica and a few months later producer Nick Cabrera flew out there to supervise the final work on the track and its subsequent remixes. German producer Kinky Roland also made a remix of the track. Following disagreements with the label, Robinson refused to let the single be released, though some 12" promotional copies do exist.

In 2001, Robinson appeared in the BBC documentary programme A Fine Romance: The Story of the New Romantics. On 2 September 2001, Marilyn performed a live appearance at the Sound on Sunday club night in Leicester Square, London. It was his first live performance in over 14 years. To promote the gig, Robinson gave a series of magazine interviews.

A 4-track self-released CD-R of older material was issued in 2003. The same year, Robinson appeared on the Channel 4 television show The Salon, a reality show based at a hairdressing salon where members of the public and several celebrities went for haircuts and beauty treatments. He also appeared in the TV documentary 25 Years of Smash Hits that traced the influence of UK pop music.

In 2006, Robinson was interviewed in the Channel 4 TV documentary Whatever Happened to the Gender Benders?, which reflected on the advent of the New Romantic movement of the early 1980s and the prominent roles that he, Boy George and Steve Strange played within it.

Career since 2013 
On 16 May 2013, Robinson appeared on Birmingham's Switch Radio where he gave a 30-minute interview. The following month, he appeared on Kev Gurney's Club Tropicana radio show on Bolton 96.5 radio where he gave a 20-minute interview in which he speaks candidly about his life. During the interview, he revealed that he has been back in the recording studio and is currently working on four new tracks with a new production team, and suggested the possibility of live dates in the future.

He appeared on an episode of Celebrity Gogglebox that aired on Channel 4 on 9 October 2015 as part of the channel's Stand Up to Cancer Charity Evening.

Robinson began reporting on his Facebook page in Spring 2015 that he has been writing and recording some new material with Boy George as producer, and some re-recordings of his back catalogue. He spoke about the new recordings at length during a June 2016 interview. On 23 September 2016, Marilyn released his first new single in over 30 years, entitled "Love or Money". The same day, both he and Boy George appeared on the television show BBC Breakfast, which showed the promo video for the single. The pair were also interviewed on Loose Women on 26 September 2016.

Personal life 
Robinson has been candid about the effect drug abuse has had on his life, and the physical and mental health problems he has suffered. In 1986, both he and Boy George were arrested in London on charges of drug possession. On 20 August 1986, at Marylebone Magistrates Court in London, a magistrate dismissed a heroin charge against Robinson because the prosecution offered no evidence. In a November 2014 interview with the Daily Mirror, he said that he was a heroin addict from the mid-1980s to the mid-2000s. Robinson says he has been clear of all drugs since 2010, after a period in rehab prompted by some specific severe health problems.

In his 1995 autobiography Take It Like a Man, Boy George wrote that in the 1980s Robinson had a relationship with singer Gavin Rossdale. In a 1996 interview for Rolling Stone, Rossdale responded: "That's George's take – he doesn't know me. There's a queue of people going to their lawyers about stuff in his book. I hope he manages to sell some books by putting my name in there." Elsewhere both Rossdale and Robinson initially denied the story but in 2003 Robinson dedicated the Marilyn CD "Hold on Tight" to Rossdale, citing "the years of our passionate relationship" and featuring a photo of them together on the cover. Later, both men spoke more candidly about their relationship, with Robinson confirming in 2009 that they had been "together five years" in the 1980s while in 2010 Rossdale said the relationship with Robinson had been an experimentation and "part of growing up". Robinson said, "Gavin and Gwen [Stefani, Rossdale's then-wife] are perfect for each other, but he was the love of my life."

Depictions in culture and media 
Exhibitions that have included material relating to Marilyn:

Nicola Tyson's 2013 Bowie Nights at Billy's Club, London, 1978 Exhibition at Sadie Coles HQ Gallery, London W1 – 25 January – 23 February 2013 

Marilyn modelled for several fashion designers including Jean Paul Gaultier and Vivienne Westwood. Several photographs of Marilyn are housed in London's National Portrait Gallery.

Books that have included references to Marilyn include:

We Can Be Heroes: Punks, Poseurs, Peacocks and People of a Particular Persuasion by Graham Smith, published by Unbound – 20 November 2012.

Take It Like a Man: The Autobiography of Boy George (1995) – Marilyn features prominently in Boy George's autobiography, which reflects on their long friendship and years together from living in a London squat and working at the Blitz Club. In the book, George claims that while they were living in a squat together, they were chased out by a neighbour (male) who was attracted to Marilyn, but who then broke the door down with an axe when he discovered Marilyn was a man. He also claims Marilyn once tried to seduce David Bowie at a London nightclub but was rebuffed.

Marilyn has been portrayed in several productions, including Boy George's stage musical Taboo which reflected on the New Romantic scene of the early '80s.

He was also portrayed by the actor Freddie Fox in the 2010 BBC television film Worried About the Boy, about the rise of Boy George in the early '80s.

Discography

Albums

Singles

References

External links 
 Official website
 Marilyn at Discogs
 Marilyn at Last.fm
 Marilyn at IMDb

1962 births
20th-century English male singers
21st-century English male singers
English drag queens
English new wave musicians
English pop singers
English male singer-songwriters
English gay musicians
English LGBT singers
English LGBT songwriters
Living people
Gay singers
Gay songwriters
Male new wave singers
Mercury Records artists
People from Borehamwood
Phonogram Inc. artists
Singers from London
20th-century squatters
20th-century LGBT people
21st-century LGBT people